A color head is an option for an enlarger in the darkroom. 

With a color head the light in the enlarger can be adjusted for color neutral results.  
Therefore there are three adjustable dichroic filters - yellow, cyan and magenta inside who allow to change the color of the light source.

References

Photography equipment